Ercea may refer to several villages in Romania:

 Ercea, a village in Căzăneşti Commune, Mehedinţi County
 Ercea, a village in Băla Commune, Mureș County